Ada Marshania (born 1 July 1961 in Sukhumi) is an ethnic Abkhaz and the Deputy of Supreme Council of the de jure Government of Abkhazia in exile in Georgia since July 2006. She is a member of the Parliament of Georgia.

See also
2006 Kodori crisis

References

1961 births
Living people
21st-century politicians from Georgia (country)
21st-century women politicians from Georgia (country)
Government ministers of Abkhazia
Members of the Parliament of Georgia
People from Sukhumi
Women government ministers of Georgia (country)